Bénédicte Auzanot (born August 5, 1972) is a French politician of the National Rally who was elected as a Member of the National Assembly for Vaucluse's 2nd constituency.

Auzanot was born in Besancon in 1972. She worked at a law firm before entering politics. During the 2022 French legislative election she contested Vaucluse's 2nd constituency and was successful at winning the seat in the second round. Since her election to the National Assembly she has served on the social affairs committee.

References

1972 births
Living people
21st-century French politicians
21st-century French women politicians
National Rally (France) politicians
Deputies of the 16th National Assembly of the French Fifth Republic
Women members of the National Assembly (France)